Sir Wilfrid Laurier Secondary School or Laurier is a high school located at 450 Millbank Drive in the south east end of London, Ontario, Canada. The school is in the Thames Valley District School Board. The school has 1,114 students and 80 teachers and is named after Canadian Prime Minister Sir Wilfrid Laurier. The school colours are green and blue. It is one of two French immersion high schools in the area.

Athletics & Clubs

Sir Wilfrid Laurier S.S has plenty of athletic opportunities available for its students. Popular sports include American football and cross country in the fall, as well as volleyball and basketball in the winter. Many other individual or small team sports are offered as well.

Besides sports teams, many other non athletic extra-curricular clubs are offered at the school. These include a drama club, robotics team, various faith based associations and a wide range of musical ensembles.

EQAO Achievement (2017–2018)
Grade 9 Student Achievement (Math)
74% of Academic Math Students achieved or surpassed the provincial standard, a change of 9% since the 2015–2016 school year. Of those 74% of Academic Students, 88% that were in the French Program achieved the standard, and 84% that were in the English program achieved the standard.

33% of Applied Math Students achieved or surpassed the provincial standard, down 6% since the 2015–2016 school year. Of those 33% of Applied Students, 51% were in the French Program, and 45% were in the English program.

Grade 10 Student Achievement (Literacy)
75% of Grade 10 students passed the Englisph Literacy Test on their first attempt. Of those 75% of students, 91% that were in the French Program passed on their first attempt, and 79% that were in the English Program passed on their first attempt. The percentage of students that passed the test on their first attempt is down 5% since the 2015–2016 school year.

See also
List of high schools in Ontario

References

External links

 
 http://www.tvraa.com/

High schools in London, Ontario
Educational institutions established in 1966
1966 establishments in Ontario